Juan Manuel González may refer to:

 Juan Manuel González Corominas (born 1968), Spanish racing driver
 Juan Manuel González Torres, Colombian politician
 Juan Manuel González (racing driver) (born 1999), Mexican racing driver
 Juan Fierro (born 1974), Chilean cyclist